Helianthus sarmentosus is a species of sunflower in the family Asteraceae. It is native to  French Guiana, part of the French Republic.

References

sarmentosus
Flora of French Guiana
Plants described in 1792